The World Scout Winter Games is an international winter sports event for Scouts.

First World Scout Winter Games
The First World Scout Winter Games was held at Kandersteg International Scout Centre between February 28 and March 3, 2008. Nine teams, representing eight countries participated. The events included cross-country skiing, curling, slalom racing, synchronised skiing, and a triathlon. The overall winners were Sweden, with a team from Svenska Scoutrådet, the Swedish Guide & Scout Council.

2nd World Scout Winter Games
The 2nd World Scout Winter Games were to be held in 2010, also in Kandersteg, but had to be cancelled due to a low number of participating countries.

See also

References

Scouting events
Winter multi-sport events